Mayenne is a commune in the Mayenne department, northwestern France. It is a subprefecture of the department. It is situated on the river Mayenne.

History
In medieval times, the town was the seat of the Lords of Mayenne. The town originated when Juhel II of Mayenne built a monastery near the gate of the pre-existing castle, which led to the formation of the settlement.

Mayenne was besieged twice during the French Wars of Religion, in 1574 and 1590, and suffered substantial damage.  It was rebuilt and re-embellished in the following century thanks to the help of Cardinal Mazarin.  It however suffered from plague in 1707.

On 9 June 1944, during World War II, it was bombed by the RAF, which caused heavy damage and numerous casualties.

Population

Main sights
 The Château, built in the 10th century (900-920) is an exceptional example of a palace dating from the Carolingian period. Reception room, tower and cellar are remarkably well preserved. The dungeon and ramparts, built in the 13th century to transform the castle into a fortress, still proudly dominate the river and the town of Mayenne. The vaulted rooms and the chapel still have thirteenth century decorations. The chapel dating from the 19th century with its baroque decoration bears witness to the long period of time he was a prison. Once used as a prison, since 2008 it is home to the "Musée du Château de Mayenne" (the Mayenne Castle Museum).
 The Basilica of Notre-Dame, founded in 1100.  Of the original building, only the piers and the arcades of the nave remain.
 Romanesque church of St. Martin, enlarged in neo-medieval style during the nineteenth century.

Notable people
 Guy Chantepleure, writer
 Paul Delaunay, physician and historian
 Elias Durand, pharmacist and botanist
 Étiemble, writer
 Marc Joulaud, politician
 Édouard Lambert, sports shooter
 Jean-François Rivière, footballer
 Romain Salin, footballer
 Michel Tronchay, priest and historian
 Élie Sauvage (1814–1871), playwright

Twin towns – sister cities

Mayenne is twinned with:
 Devizes, England, United Kingdom
 Jesi, Italy
 Waiblingen, Germany

See also
Communes of Mayenne
Jublains archeological site

References

External links
Official Web site

Communes of Mayenne
Subprefectures in France
Maine (province)
Diablintes